Magdalen College Boat Club (MCBC) is a rowing club for members of Magdalen College, Oxford. It is based on the Isis at Boathouse Island, Christ Church Meadow, Oxford, Oxford.

History
The club founded in 1859 shares a boathouse with Linacre College Boat Club, Lady Margaret Hall Boat Club & Trinity College Boat Club. The club has two Olympic Gold medal winners throughout its history and has a very successful record of providing rowers for The Boat Races.

Honours

Henley Royal Regatta

See also
University rowing (UK)
Oxford University Boat Club
Rowing on the River Thames

References

Rowing clubs of the University of Oxford
Magdalen College, Oxford
Rowing clubs in Oxfordshire
Rowing clubs of the River Thames
Sport in Oxford
Rowing clubs in England
Sports clubs established in 1859